Louis Johnson (born November 4, 1938) is an American boxer. He competed in the men's bantamweight event at the 1964 Summer Olympics. At the 1964 Summer Olympics, he defeated Jan Huppen of the Netherlands, before losing to Nicolae Puiu of Romania.

References

External links
 

1938 births
Living people
American male boxers
Olympic boxers of the United States
Boxers at the 1964 Summer Olympics
Boxers from Portland, Oregon
Bantamweight boxers